Samuel Wilds Trotti (July 18, 1810 – June 24, 1856) was a U.S. Representative from South Carolina.

Born in Barnwell, South Carolina, Trotti attended the common schools.  He graduated from South Carolina College (now University of South Carolina) at Columbia in 1832.  He studied law and was admitted to the bar.  He served in the Seminole War.

Trotti served as member of the State house of representatives from 1840 to 1841 from 1852 to 1855.  He was elected as a Democrat to the Twenty-seventh Congress to fill the vacancy caused by the resignation of Sampson H. Butler and served from December 17, 1842, to March 3, 1843.

He resumed the practice of law.  He died in Buckhead, Fairfield District (now county), South Carolina, June 24, 1856.

Sources

People from Barnwell, South Carolina
1810 births
1856 deaths
American military personnel of the Indian Wars
Democratic Party members of the South Carolina House of Representatives
Democratic Party members of the United States House of Representatives from South Carolina
19th-century American politicians